Mucilaginibacter kameinonensis is a Gram-negative and non-motile bacterium from the genus of Mucilaginibacter which has been isolated from garden soil from Kameino in Fujisawa in Japan.

References

External links
Type strain of Mucilaginibacter kameinonensis at BacDive -  the Bacterial Diversity Metadatabase

Sphingobacteriia
Bacteria described in 2008